Adodo Anselm Gbenga (born 1969) is a Nigerian scholar who has advocated for alternative medicine. He is also a Benedictine monk and priest of the Roman Catholic Church in Edo State, Nigeria. He founded Nigeria’s first alternative medicine and research laboratory enterprise, called Pax Herbal Clinic and Research Laboratories, in 1997.

He has written several books on alternative medicine, nutrition and health, and epidemiology.

Education and career 

In 1979, Adodo joined the St. Thomas Aquinas College Akure to begin his secondary school education. By the year 1985, he had successfully completed his secondary school education and was awarded a West African school certificate. When he visited Ewu Monastery in 1987, it was the peace and tranquillity of the natural environment that really struck him.

In November 1987 Adodo joined the Ewu Monastery.

In 1992 he obtained a Higher Diploma in Scholastic Philosophy from the Ewu Monastery studium of Philosophy.

In 1995 he obtained a BA in Religious Studies from the University of Nigeria, Nsukka.

In 1997 he obtained a Master's degree in Systematic Theology from Duquesne University.

In 2017 he obtained a PhD. in Medical Sociology from the University of Benin (Nigeria).

The Da Vinci Institute, South Africa awarded him a Ph.D. (Management of Technology and Innovation systems) in 2015 for his doctoral studies, which he started in 2012.

He is an adjunct professor at Institute of African Studies (IAS), University of Ibadan, Nigeria (where he teaches African Transformation Studies and Traditional African Medicine) and is also Chief Executive Officer at Paxherbals and director of Ofure (Pax) Integral Research and Development Initiative.

Alternative Medicine

Philosophy
Adodo prefers the term "African Medicine" to "Traditional Medicine". He defines African medicine as a system of healing grounded in an African worldview, culture, and accumulated beliefs and practices, which uses herbs and other plants as solutions to physical and spiritual ailments. African medicine, he believes, is founded on indigenous, biological, and medico-spiritual theories and concept of the human body; the role of the individual as a member of the community; and their relationship with the community, with the environment and with nature.

Background
Adodo first began studying alternative medicine in the early 1990s. He traveled around Nigeria and spoke with traditional healers, and Adodo said he felt called to preserve their knowledge.

Personal life 
Adodo is the third of five children of his parents.  Bankole, Funke, Bandele (Dele), and Omotola (Tola) are the names of his siblings.

Honours
 Fellow, Nigeria Society of Botanists

Works
Adodo has written books which includes:
 Herbs for healing. Receiving God’s Healing Through nature (1997). Ilorin: Decency Printers
 Nature power - A Christian Approach to Herbal Medicine (2000). Akure: Don Bosco Publishers
 The Healing Radiance of the Soul. A Guide to Holistic Healing (2003). Lagos: Agelex Publication
 New Frontiers in African Medicine (2005). Lagos: Metropolitan Publishers; Herbal Medicine and the Revival of African Civilization (2010). Lagos: Zoe Communications
 Disease and Dietary Patterns in Edo Central Nigeria. An epidemiological survey (2013) Germany: Lambert Academic Publishing
 Nature Power: Natural Medicine in Tropical Africa (2013 revised edition). UK: Author House
 Integral Community Enterprise in Africa. Communitalism as an Alternative to Capitalism (2017) London: Routledge.

Notes

References

Further reading
 Ronnie, Lessem (2016). The Integrators: The Next Evolution in Leadership, Knowledge and Value Creation. Routledge. pp. 385, 540. . Retrieved 15 May 2017.
 Ewu, Monastery (2004). The Story of Ewu Monastery. St. Benedict Monastery. . Retrieved 15 May 2017.

External links
 Ofure-Pax Integral Research and Development Initiative (OFIRDI)

Herbalists
Living people
Nigerian Roman Catholic priests
Nigerian Benedictines
1969 births